The Australian Triple Crown is a three-race competition for thoroughbred racehorses.

The Australian Triple Crown consists of the Randwick Guineas (1600 metres) (previously the Canterbury Guineas), the Rosehill Guineas (2000m), and the Australian Derby (2400m).

The first leg of the Australian Triple Crown is the Randwick Guineas. It is run at the Randwick Racecourse in Sydney. The race replaced the former Canterbury Guineas (1900 metres), which was discontinued after the 2005 racing season. That race, which originated in 1935, was run at the Canterbury Park Racecourse, also at Sydney, New South Wales. 

The second leg of the Australian Triple Crown is the Rosehill Guineas. A horse race since 1910, it is run at the Rosehill Gardens Racecourse, located in Sydney. 

The third and last leg of the Australian Triple Crown is the Australian Derby. This race, established in 1861, is run at the Randwick Racecourse, in Sydney.

All three Group One races are open to three-year-olds and all are located at Sydney, New South Wales, Australia.

Australian Triple Crown winners

1919 and 1935: dead-heat
1928: Prince Humphrey recorded as race winner, though his brother Cragsman had won the race
1978: no races, due to racing change from spring to autumn

See also
 Triple Crown of Thoroughbred Racing

References

External links
 Canterbury/Randwick Guineas winners
 Rosehill Guineas winners
 Australian Derby winners

Horse races in Australia
Triple Crown of Thoroughbred Racing